"Let It Rain" is a song recorded by Canadian country music artist Shirley Myers. It was released in 1997 as the first single from her debut album, Let It Rain. It peaked at number 3 on the RPM Country Tracks chart in August 1997.

Chart performance

Year-end charts

References

1997 songs
1997 singles
Shirley Myers songs
Songs written by Shirley Myers
Stony Plain Records singles